The Cartoon Network Hotel is a resort-style hotel located in Lancaster, Pennsylvania. The hotel is managed by Palace Entertainment, who licenses the Cartoon Network name from Cartoon Network owner, Warner Bros. Discovery The hotel was Cartoon Network's second entry into the hotel business after the Cartoon Network-branded experience at Hotel Cozzi Ximen Tainan, in Tainan, Taiwan.

The hotel opened on January 10, 2020, and consists of 165 remodeled hotel rooms, a resort-style pool, kids' play area, indoor arcade, coffee lounge, full bar, and a gift shop with Cartoon Network-related merchandise.

History

As Ramada Inn
The hotel opened as a Ramada Inn in 1971, primarily on land owned by Earl Clark, owner of the Dutch Wonderland theme park located close by. The motel ran into financial trouble and was sold to Michael Gleiberman in 1974.

As Continental Inn
The Gleiberman family renamed the motel the Continental Inn. The hotel consisted of 165 hotel rooms, along with a tennis court, an outdoor and indoor pool, free breakfast, a game room, and a fitness room. It operated until January 2018 when Palace Entertainment, the owners of nearby Dutch Wonderland, purchased the hotel for $4.7 million with the intention of remodeling it into a family-friendly resort.

Announcement of New Hotel
In October 2018, a partnership formed between Turner's then-owned Cartoon Network and Palace Entertainment to convert the former Continental Inn into the first Cartoon Network Hotel, to open in Summer 2019. In March 2019, despite the dissolution of Turner Broadcasting System, the hotel retained the Cartoon Network brand with an agreement with Warner Bros. In January 2020, after delays, the hotel opened.

Incidents
In August 2017, the hotel, then known as Continental Inn, suffered a mechanical fire near the indoor pool at around 4:20 PM. Firefighters extinguished it quickly yet two firefighters were hospitalized for chlorine inhalation. Damage from the fire was estimated at about $250,000.

See also
 Nickelodeon Family Suites by Holiday Inn; a former themed hotel for rival network Nickelodeon

References

External links
 

Buildings and structures in Lancaster, Pennsylvania
Cartoon Network
Tourist attractions in Lancaster, Pennsylvania
2020 establishments in Pennsylvania